Anne Amuzu is a Ghanaian computer scientist and the co-founder of the technology company, Nandimobile Limited.

Education 
Amuzu had her secondary level education at the St. Louis Senior High School. She then furthered at the Kwame Nkrumah University of Science and Technology where she acquired a Bachelor of Science degree in Computer Engineering. She proceeded to Meltwater Entrepreneurial School of Technology where she was training in Entrepreneurship and Software Engineering.

Career 

In 2010, Amuzu co-founded Nandimobile Limited with Michael Dakwa and Edward Amartey-Tagoe, a company that develops software that enables companies to deliver customer support and information services through SMS. She has been the Lead Technical developer of Nandimobile Limited since 2010.

Since its founding, Nandimobile Limited has received several awards, including Best business at the 2011 LAUNCH conference in USA, 2012 Top up award for the best SMS App in Ghana and 2013 WORLD summit awards in e-commerce and creativity.

Awards and Achievements 

 2014 - Selected for Eighth Annual Fortune/U.S. State Department Global Women's Mentoring Partnership Program
2014 - Won The Future Africa Awards & Summit Class Prize in Technology
2015 - Listed in Newaccra Achievers List

Amusu's company Nandimobile Limited has received several awards, including best business at the 2011 LAUNCH Conference in USA, 2012 Top up award for the best SMS App in Ghana and 2013 World Summit Awards in e-commerce and creativity .

Philanthropy 
She is mostly found volunteering her service to teach young girls how to code.

References

Living people
Ghanaian computer scientists
21st-century Ghanaian businesswomen
21st-century Ghanaian businesspeople
Kwame Nkrumah University of Science and Technology alumni
Year of birth missing (living people)